Invasion of Wales may refer to several invasions of Wales including:

 Norman invasion of Wales
 French invasion of Wales (1797)

For larger invasions of the whole of Great Britain see Invasion of Great Britain